Nathan Power (born 13 February 1993) is an Australian water polo player.

Power was picked in the water polo Sharks squad to compete in the men's water polo tournament at the 2020 Summer Olympics. Coached by  Elvis Fatović, the team finished joint fourth on points in their pool but their inferior goal average meant they finished fifth overall and out of medal contention. They were able to upset Croatia in a group stage match 11–8. Australia at the 2020 Summer Olympics details the results in depth.

Early life
Power was born 13 February 1993 and raised in Newcastle, New South Wales. He attended Merewether High School. Power graduated from the University of New South Wales in 2020, completing a Bachelor of Economics.

References

1993 births
Living people
Sportspeople from Newcastle, New South Wales
Water polo players from Split, Croatia
Water polo players at the 2020 Summer Olympics
Australian male water polo players
Olympic water polo players of Australia
21st-century Australian people